As of July 2016, the International Union for Conservation of Nature (IUCN) listed 394 critically endangered arthropod species, including 86 which are tagged as possibly extinct. 4.1% of all evaluated arthropod species are listed as critically endangered.  The IUCN also lists three arthropod subspecies as critically endangered.

No subpopulations of arthropods have been evaluated by the IUCN.

Additionally 2875 arthropod species (30% of those evaluated) are listed as data deficient, meaning there is insufficient information for a full assessment of conservation status. As these species typically have small distributions and/or populations, they are intrinsically likely to be threatened, according to the IUCN. While the category of data deficient indicates that no assessment of extinction risk has been made for the taxa, the IUCN notes that it may be appropriate to give them "the same degree of attention as threatened taxa, at least until their status can be assessed".

This is a complete list of critically endangered arthropod species and subspecies as evaluated by the IUCN. Species considered possibly extinct by the IUCN are marked as such.

Centipedes

Seed shrimps
Kapcypridopsis barnardi
Spelaeoecia bermudensis

Arachnids
There are 47 arachnid species assessed as critically endangered.

Harvestmen

Spiders

Other arachnid species

Branchiopoda

Millipedes

Entognatha
Ceratophysella sp. nov. 'HC' (possibly extinct)
Delamarephorura tami (possibly extinct)

Maxillopoda

Malacostracans
Malacostraca includes crabs, lobsters, crayfish, shrimp, krill, woodlice, and many others. There are 125 malacostracan species and one malacostracan subspecies assessed as critically endangered.

Mysida
Bermudamysis speluncola
Sterrer's cave mysid (Platyops sterreri)

Mictaceans
Mictocaris halope

Isopods

Amphipods

Decapods
There are 106 decapod species and one decapod subspecies assessed as critically endangered.

Parastacids

Gecarcinucids

Atyids

Cambarids

Species

Subspecies
Procambarus rogersi expletus

Palaemonids

Other decapod species

Insects

There are 195 insect species and two insect subspecies assessed as critically endangered.

Blattodea

Orthoptera
There are 72 species in the order Orthoptera assessed as critically endangered.

Euschmidtiids

Crickets

Acridids

Tettigoniids

Other Orthoptera species

Hymenoptera

Lepidoptera

Beetles

Odonata

Species

Subspecies
Chlorogomphus brunneus keramensis
Delphi cordulegaster (Cordulegaster helladica kastalia)

Other insect species

See also 
 Lists of IUCN Red List critically endangered species
 List of least concern arthropods
 List of near threatened arthropods
 List of vulnerable arthropods
 List of endangered arthropods
 List of recently extinct arthropods
 List of data deficient arthropods

References 

Arthropods
Critically endangered arthropods
Critically endangered arthropods
Arthropod conservation